Bełdno  is a village and sołectwo in the administrative district of Gmina Żegocina, within Bochnia County, Lesser Poland Voivodeship, in southern Poland.

Origins
The village was established in 1398 according to the Magdeburg rights. These days it is the smallest of the subdivisions of the gmina.

Shrine
By the road to Żegocina there is a wayside shrine to Our Lady of Perpetual Succour. It contains a statue of the Virgin that was rescued from the main hall of Kraków station during the upheavals of September 1939.

References

Villages in Bochnia County